The  is an archaeological site containing the ruins of an early Jōmon period (4000–2500 BCE) settlement located in what is now part of the city of Yonezawa, Yamagata in the Tōhoku region of Japan. The site was designated a National Historic Site of Japan in 1997.

Overview
The ruins are located on a river terrace at the foot of a hill in the southwestern end of the Yonezawa Basin and extend for 90 meters east–west by 80 meters north–south. During excavations in conjunction with land development in 1989, the foundations of the longest pit dwelling thus far found in Japan, with a length of 43.5 meters and width of four meters was discovered. This longhouse-type structure was contemporary with the Sannai-Maruyama Site in Aomori Prefecture to the north. The purpose of such a huge building is uncertain, but from the presence of six furnaces spaced evenly along one wall, and almost two million shards and semi-finished examples for stoneware, especially stone lances and stone harpoons, it was believed to be a production center for stone tools. Further excavations from 1990 to 1994 found the foundations for a further 24 smaller pit dwellings and six earthenware graves.

The site was backfilled after excavation and is now a grassy hill with an explanatory plaque. It is located approximately 17 minutes on foot from  Nishi-Yonezawa Station on the JR East Yonesaka Line

See also
List of Historic Sites of Japan (Yamagata)

References

External links
Yonezawa official site  
Cultural Assets of Yamagata Prefecture  

Jōmon period
History of Yamagata Prefecture
Yonezawa, Yamagata
Archaeological sites in Japan
Historic Sites of Japan